James LaBrie (formally MullMuzzler or James LaBrie's MullMuzzler) is the progressive metal solo side project by James LaBrie, the lead singer of Dream Theater, before recording under his own name in 2005. The record company would not allow LaBrie to use his own name, so he created the name of MullMuzzler. LaBrie coined the word MullMuzzler and defined it as: to gag or silence an individual's thought before it can be expressed in any manner. For the follow-up, he negotiated the right to use his name although still unable to simply credit it as his solo album.

Discography
Keep It to Yourself – 1999
MullMuzzler 2 – 2001
Elements of Persuasion - 2005
Prime Cuts - 2008
Static Impulse - 2010
Impermanent Resonance - 2013
Beautiful Shade of Grey - 2022

Members

Current members
James LaBrie -	 vocals (1999–present)
Matt Guillory - keyboards, vocals (1999–present)
Marco Sfogli - guitar (2005–present)
Peter Wildoer - drums, harsh vocals (2010–present)
Ray Riendeau - bass (2010–present)

Former members

Guitar
Mike Keneally - (1999-2005)

Bass
Bryan Beller - (1999-2005)
Andy DeLuca - (2005-2010)

Drums
Mike Mangini - (1999-2005)
John Macaluso - (2005-2010)

Timeline

References

External links
MullMuzzler @ Rock Detector
Allmusic.com biography

Living people
Year of birth missing (living people)